Luo Zhuoying (19 March 1896 – 6 November 1961) was a Republic of China General (二級上將). He was active during the Second Sino-Japanese War and was later the Governor of Guangdong.

Military career
1937 Commander in Chief 15th Army Group
1937 General Officer Commanding 16th Army
1937 - 1938 General Officer Commanding XVIII Corps
1938 - 1941 Commander in Chief 19th Army Group
1938 Commander in Chief Wuhan Garrison Command
1939 Commander in Chief Frontline Area 9th War Area
1941 Deputy Commander in Chief 9th war Area
1942 Commander in Chief 1st Route Expeditionary Forces, Burma
1942 Chief of Staff to American General Stillwell
     Commandant of Officers' Training Center Southeast China
1944 - 1945 Commandant of Officers' Training Center, National Military Council
1945 - 1947 Chairman of the Government of Guangdong Province

References
 http://www.generals.dk/general/Luo_Zhuoying/_/China.html
 Hsu Long-hsuen and Chang Ming-kai, History of The Sino-Japanese War (1937–1945) 2nd Ed., 1971. Translated by Wen Ha-hsiung, Chung Wu Publishing; 33, 140th Lane, Tung-hwa Street, Taipei, Taiwan Republic of China.

National Revolutionary Army generals from Guangdong
People of the Northern Expedition
1896 births
1961 deaths
Taiwanese people of Hakka descent
Hakka generals
People from Dabu
Taiwanese people from Guangdong